Sol Picó Monllor (born 1967) is a Spanish dancer and choreographer. She has studied , ballet, and contemporary dance, and combines different techniques and languages in her productions in a groundbreaking way. In 1993 she created the Sol Picó Company, with which she has become one of the most heterodox choreographers and dancers of the Spanish contemporary scene.

Biography
Sol Picó graduated in Spanish and Classical Dance at the Oscar Esplà Conservatory in Alicante in 1985. She completed her training at La Fábrica Espai de Dansa in Barcelona (1986–1988), La Ménagerie de Verre in Paris (1988–1989), and Movement Research in New York (1997).

Professional career
She took her first steps as a professional with the Alcoy theater company La Cassola, and created her first company, Danza Robadura, in 1988. From 1990 to 2003, during the first years of her professional career, she worked as a performer and choreographer with companies and creators such as Rayo Malayo Danza, and La Fura dels Baus. In 1993, she created the Sol Picó Company in Barcelona, which allowed her to develop her personal stamp and establish herself in the city.

From 2002 to 2004, the Sol Picó Company was a resident dance company at the Teatre Nacional de Catalunya.

Trained in classical dance and performing in alternative theater,  she has become one of the most heterodox choreographers and dancers of the contemporary scene.

In 2003 she premiered La dona manca o Barbi-Superestar, a show that explores the female universe. Nine female performers, six dancers, and three musicians build and deconstruct the feminine world, its integrity and fragility. In her review for the newspaper La Vanguardia,  wrote:

In the spring of 2009 Picó premiered El llac de les mosques (The Lake of the Flies), a piece for two dancers, four musicians, and an actor, described as:

In 2012 she prepared Llàgrimes d'Àngel (Angel Tears) on the occasion of the presentation of the Romanesque Art Collection at the Museu Nacional d'Art de Catalunya. That November she inaugurated the Fringe Festival, Beijing's international avant-garde performing arts event, with El llac de les mosques.

Her next production was Memòries d'una puça (Memories of a Flea). In 2013 Picó reflected on the financial crisis and proposed a flight forward as a reaction and hope for the social situation. A very hard physical spectacle that caused a serious injury to the dancer during its premiere at the Festival Temporada Alta, it was conceived "as a sort of intimate 'red movie', asking constant questions: 'In the continuous movement, do we flee or move forward?'; 'What do we leave behind and how does it affect us?'; 'To what extent are we real participants in the construction of our future?'; 'The relations established in this nomadic journey – are they complicit, are they collaborative?'; 'Who are we and how do we choose our traveling companions?'"

In 2014 she presented One-hit wonders, a solo show in which she reviews her 20-year career, selecting the best moments of her shows Bésame el Cactus (2000), La dona manca o Barbi-Superestar (2003), Paella mixta (2004), Memòries d'una puça (2012), and DVA (2012).

In May 2014 she premiered La piel del huevo te lo da at Barcelona's Ciutat Flamenco Festival, reflecting on women through flamenco and contemporary dance. She directed and performed in the show with actress Candela Peña in her theatrical debut, the singer La Shica, and the musicians Dani Tejedor on percussion and Bernat Guardia on double bass.

In 2016, she received the National Dance Award in the Creation category, granted by Spain's Ministry of Education, Culture, and Sports.

Commitment to equality
Picó reflects the feminine universe in many of her works, questions stereotypes, and is committed to the defense of equality. In 2012 she endorsed a letter signed by 200 women from all areas of Catalan culture addressed to the Generalitat de Catalunya's Minister of Culture, calling for "an effort to combat gender inequality." Also in January 2014, she endorsed a letter to the government from women intellectuals and artists requesting the withdrawal of the draft bill presented by Minister Gallardón which would reduce women's rights in regard to abortion. In the show WW We Women (2015) she presents a collective and intercultural perspective with a collaborative project with other artists to reflect on the role of women within the current social structure. It was written by  about the silenced perspectives of women in the Spanish Civil War and Franco's dictatorship.

Works

Collaborations
 1991: Actress at the 1st Conferencia en Rilolaxcia '91 with 
 1993: Video of the El Último de la Fila song "Como un burro amarrado en la puerta del baile"
 1993: Actress in the short film Retrats directed by Marcel.lí Antúnez and JM Aixalá
 2003: Actress and co-director with Octavi Masià on the short film El 64
 2007: Artistic direction of the 2007 Premios Max gala in Bilbao, and of Viatges a la Felicitat for the Teatre Nacional de Catalunya's project "T Dansa"
 2009: Direction of the marionette play and music for the Barcelona salon "La Puntual" with singer Mariona Sagarra and puppeteer Eugenio Navarro; recording of the short film Praeludium by Pau Durà; actress and dancer in the play El Ball directed by Sergi Belbel
 2010: Guided tour Vist per Sol Picó of the Picasso Museum in Barcelona
 2011: Participation in the exhibition Salvador Dalí canta at the Acoustic Festival of Figueres; participation in the inaugural season of the Theater l'Archipel of Perpignan; participation in the TV special Una historia para el nuevo año; guided tour of the MNAC with the piece Llàgrimes d'Àngel
 2012: Choreography for the Gala Gaudí; workshops Animalaris in Madrid and Juneda InCursió, Lleida; choreography for the concert A tot Vent at L'Auditori, Barcelona; appearance in the Dácil López music video "¿Por qué no estás aquí?"
 2015: Film Cerca de tu casa with director Eduard Cortés about evictions

Awards and recognitions

Premios Max

Others
 2002: Butaca Award for Best Dance Show for Bésame el Cactus
 2002: Valencia Critics' Award for Bésame el Cactus
 2003: Performing Arts Awards of the Generalitat Valenciana: Best Dance Performer, Best Choreographic Direction, Best Dance Show for Bésame el Cactus
 2003: Public Prize of Tarragona for Best Dance Show for Bésame el Cactus
 2003: Butaca Award for Best Dance Show for La dona manca o Barbi-Superestar
 2004: 
 2007: Billboard Award of Turias
 2008: La Peladilla d'Or d'Alcoy
 2009: FAD Sebastià Gasch Prize for El Llac de les Mosques
 2009: Prize for Best Show of the 15th edition of the International Street Theater Festival in Pula, Croatia for Sirena a la plancha
 2009: Prize for Best Dance Production of the 23rd International Theater and Dance Fair of Huesca for El llac de les mosques
 2012: Prize of the TVE program Continuará
 2015: 
 2016: National Dance Award of Spain, Creation Category

References

External links
 

1967 births
20th-century Spanish dancers
21st-century Spanish dancers
Contemporary dancers
Flamenco dancers
Living people
People from Alcoy
Spanish ballerinas
Spanish choreographers
Women choreographers
20th-century Spanish women